Provincial Route 105 is a highway located in the Argentine province of La Pampa. Its total route is 180 km, being partially asphalt.

Route
Its northern end is the border with the San Luis Province; in that province it is called Provincial Route 55. It crosses the FCDFS tracks in the city of Victorica, and Provincial Route 10 about  further south. It runs south through the town of Carro Quemado, being asphalt until Provincial Route 14 in the El Durazno area. From there, it is a natural dirt road that heads southwest towards National Route 152.

History
From 1935 to 1979, RP 105 belonged entirely to National Route 148.

References

Provincial roads in La Pampa Province